Tingena monodonta is a species of moth in the family Oecophoridae. It is endemic to New Zealand and has been found in both the North and South Islands. This species inhabits native beech forest at altitudes of between 2500 - 3000 ft. The adults of the species are on the wing from November and December.

Taxonomy 
 
This species was first described by Edward Meyrick in 1911 using specimens collected by R. M. Sunley at Mount Holdsworth at altitudes of between 3000 - 4000 ft in November. In 1915 Meyrick placed this species within the Borkhausenia genus. In that same publication Meyrick synonymised Cremnogenes nigra with Borkhausenia monodonta. In 1926 Alfred Philpott discussed and illustrated the genitalia of the male of this species. In 1928 George Hudson also discussed and illustrated this species in his book The butterflies and moths of New Zealand. In 1988 J. S. Dugdale placed this species within the genus Tingena. The male lectotype is held at the Natural History Museum, London.

Description

Meyrick described this species as follows:

Distribution
This species is endemic to New Zealand. This species has been observed in the Wellington region, Mount Arthur, Arthur's Pass and in the mountains in Otago.

Behaviour 
The adults of this species are on the wing in November and December.

Habitat 
T. monodonta inhabits native beech forest at altitudes from 2500 - 3000 ft.

References

Oecophoridae
Moths of New Zealand
Moths described in 1911
Endemic fauna of New Zealand
Taxa named by Edward Meyrick
Endemic moths of New Zealand